"Blue Side of Town" is a song written by Paul Kennerley and Hank DeVito, and recorded by American country music artist Patty Loveless.  It was released in October 1988 as the first single from her album Honky Tonk Angel.

Loveless purchased the recording rights to this song in 1985, a few years before she recorded it but it was not included on her self-titled album, Patty Loveless.

The song charted for 22 weeks on the Billboard Hot Country Singles and Tracks chart, reaching #4 during the week of January 14, 1989.

Charts

References

Covers
Canadian country music singer Lori Yates recorded the song for her 1989 album Can't Stop the Girl. 
Rosie Flores recorded the song for her 1987 self-titled album Rosie Flores.

1988 singles
Patty Loveless songs
Lori Yates songs
Song recordings produced by Tony Brown (record producer)
Songs written by Paul Kennerley
MCA Nashville Records singles
Songs written by Hank DeVito
1987 songs